Margaret of France (1158 – 18 September 1197) was junior Queen of England by marriage to  Henry the Young King until his death in 1183, and Queen of Hungary and Croatia by marriage to Béla III of Hungary from 1186.

Family history
Margaret was the eldest daughter of Louis VII of France by his second wife Constance of Castile. Her older half-sisters, Marie and Alix, were also older half-sisters of her future husband.

She was betrothed to Henry the Young King on 2 November 1160. Henry was the second son of King Henry II of England and Eleanor of Aquitaine. He was five years old at the time of this agreement while Margaret was about two. Margaret's dowry was the vital and much disputed territory of Vexin.

Queen of England
Margaret's husband became co-ruler with his father in 1170. Because Archbishop Thomas Becket was in exile, Margaret was not crowned along with her husband on 14 July 1170. This omission and the coronation being handled by a surrogate greatly angered her father. To please the French King, Henry II had his son and Margaret crowned together in Winchester Cathedral on 27 August 1172. When Margaret became pregnant, she held her confinement in Paris, where she gave birth prematurely to their only son William on 19 June 1177, who died three days later on 22 June. She had no further children.

Margaret was accused in 1182 of having a love affair with William Marshal, 1st Earl of Pembroke, although contemporary chroniclers doubted the truth of these accusations. Henry may have started the process to have their marriage annulled ostensibly due to her adultery, but in reality, because she could not have children. Margaret was sent back to France, according to E. Hallam (The Plantagenets) and Amy Kelly (Eleonore of Aquitaine and the Four Kings), to ensure her safety during the civil war with Young Henry's brother Richard the Lionheart. Her husband died in 1183 while on campaign in the Dordogne region of France. The coronet he and she would have worn was chronicled in about 1218 as "the traditional ring-of-roses coronet of the house of Anjou". Margaret may have taken her coronet to Hungary in 1186 when she married King Bela III. A ring-of-roses coronet was discovered in a convent grave in Budapest in 1838, which may be the same one.

Queen of Hungary
After receiving a substantial pension in exchange for surrendering her dowry of Gisors and the Vexin, Margaret became the second wife of Béla III of Hungary in 1186.

She was widowed for a second time in 1196 and died on pilgrimage to the Holy Land at St John of Acre in 1197, having only arrived eight days prior to her death. She was buried at the Cathedral of Tyre, according to Ernoul, the chronicler who continued the chronicles of William of Tyre.

Notes

References

Sources

|-

|-

1158 births
1197 deaths
French princesses
English royal consorts
Duchesses of Normandy
Countesses of Anjou
Countesses of Maine
House of Capet
House of Plantagenet
House of Árpád
Hungarian queens consort
12th-century French people
12th-century English people
12th-century Hungarian people
12th-century French women
12th-century English women
12th-century Hungarian women
Henry the Young King
Remarried royal consorts
Daughters of kings